FabricLive.66 is a 2012 DJ mix album by Daniel Avery. The album was released as part of the FabricLive Mix Series.

Track list

References

External links
 FabricLive.66 at Fabric London

Fabric (club) albums
2012 compilation albums